The Women's road race C4-5 cycling event at the 2012 Summer Paralympics took place on September 6 at Brands Hatch. Fifteen riders from nine different nations competed. The race distance was 64 km.

Results
DNF = Did Not Finish

Source:

References

Women's road race C4-5
2012 in women's road cycling